Captain Jerry Cox Vasconcells (1892 - 1950) was a World War I flying ace credited with six aerial victories. Vasconcells was inducted into the Colorado Aviation Hall of Fame in its first ceremony of 1969.

Biography

Early years 
Jerry Vasconcells was born in Lyons, Kansas on December 3, 1892. He attended East High School, in Denver, Colorado, attended Dartmouth College, and then graduated from the University of Denver Law School.

Military service 
Vasconcells joined the U.S. Army Air Corps at the onset of World War I, and was sent to France in 1917 to fly combat. While flying the SPAD biplane in combat, he was shot down, but with skilled flying he landed in "no man's land" and was rescued by Allied soldiers. He became an "ace" with a score of six airplanes and two balloons. He was awarded the French Croix de Guerre and other honors from both the French and American governments. Vasconcells was a flight commander for the 27th Aero Squadron of the 1st Pursuit Group, American Expeditionary Forces (AEF) in 1918, and by war's end he was in command of the 185th Aero Squadron, the first night pursuit squadron of the AEF. Jerry Vasconcells was Colorado's only ace of the war.

Vasconcells' military career included associations with other renown aviators, including Capt. Eddie Rickenbacker, Gen. Billy Mitchell and Frank Luke. In 1919, he acquired a Military Aviator flight rating and was promoted to major. Upon returning to the United States, he had numerous health issues relating to his military flying.

Commercial businesses 
He and Mayor Benjamin F. Stapleton established Denver's Municipal Airfield with scheduled commercial flight service. During his commercial aviation career in Denver, he served two terms as chairman of the Colorado Aeronautics Commission, and helped organize the first Colorado Air Meet in 1921. Jerry helped to create and organize the Quiet Birdmen Association.

He died at his home in Denver in 1950.

See also

 List of World War I flying aces from the United States
 Original ten 1969 Colorado Aviation Hall of Fame Laureates
 Ivy Baldwin
 Allan F. Bonnalie
 Ira Boyd "Bumps" Humphreys
 Albert E. Humphreys
 Will D. "Billy" Parker
 Chriss J. Peterson
 Reginald Sinclaire
 George W. Thompson
 Frank A. Van Dersarl
 Jerry Cox Vasconcells
 List of current Hall of Fame Laureates

References

Bibliography
 American Aces of World War I. Norman Franks, Harry Dempsey. Osprey Publishing, 2001. , .
 Terror of the Autumn Skies: The True Story of Frank Luke, America's Rogue Ace of World War I, 2008, by Blaine L. Pardoe, Skyhorse Publishing, New York, New York;

External links
 USA WWI: Aces
 SlideShare.net: USAS 1st Pursuit Group (Aviation Elite Units) by Jon Guttman
 Colorado Aviation Historical Society website

American World War I flying aces
Aviators from Kansas
American people of Portuguese descent
1892 births
1950 deaths
People from Lyons, Kansas